The Men's team sprint event of the 2016 UCI Track Cycling World Championships was held on 2 March 2016. New Zealand won the gold medal.

Results

Qualifying
The qualifying was started at 15:29.

Finals
The finals were started at 21:00.

References

Men's team sprint
UCI Track Cycling World Championships – Men's team sprint